Lucas Martínez Lara (13 March 1946 – 9 April 2016) was a Mexican Roman Catholic bishop.

Ordained to the priesthood in 1968, Martinez Lara was named bishop of the Roman Catholic Diocese of Matehuala, Mexico in 2006; he died while still in office.

Notes

1946 births
2016 deaths
21st-century Roman Catholic bishops in Mexico